Raphoe railway station served the town of Raphoe in County Donegal, Ireland.

The station opened on 1 January 1909 when the Strabane to Letterkenny opened. The initially independent Strabane & Letterkenny Railway Company was worked by the County Donegal Railways (Joint Committee) during its short life.

It closed on 1 January 1960.

Routes

References

Disused railway stations in County Donegal
Railway stations opened in 1909
Railway stations closed in 1960
Raphoe